Theodore Pratt (1901–1969) was an American writer who is best known for his novels set in Florida. He wrote more than 30 novels, which were adapted into films five times.

Biography
Pratt was born in Minneapolis, Minnesota in 1901 to Thomas A. and Emma Pratt. The family later moved to New Rochelle, New York, where Theodore attended high school. After completing high school, he attended Colgate University for two years, and then Columbia University for another two years, but did not graduate. He worked in New York City as a play reader, a staff reader for a movie company, and a columnist for the New York Sun.  He also free-lanced articles for The New Yorker and other national magazines.

Theodore Pratt married Belle Jacqueline (Jackie) Jacques in 1929.  The couple went to Europe for their honeymoon, and stayed for four years, during which he served as the European correspondent for the New York Sun. The Pratts eventually settled in Majorca, Spain, where Pratt wrote a column for the English language Daily Palma Post. In 1933 Pratt wrote an article for The American Mercury called "Paradise Enjoys a Boom" that was highly critical of the Majorcan character and way of life (he called Majorcans "among the cruelest people to animals extant in the civilized world", and said "they make inept servants, and when not shirking their work from pure laziness or contrariness, they are stealing food to take to their own home").  After parts of the article appeared in translation in Majorca, the Pratts were forced to leave Spain and returned to the United States.

The Pratts moved to Lake Worth, Florida in 1934. In 1946 the Pratts moved for a brief period to California, but returned to Florida to live in Boca Raton. In 1958 the Pratts moved to Delray Beach, Florida, where he died in 1969.

Pratt traveled extensively in Florida, in particular away from the tourist areas on the east coast, to gather material for his writing.  While he was writing Mercy Island, he lived in the Florida Keys so that he could more accurately portray the lives of the Conch people of the Keys.  His Escape to Eden incorporated material from a trip into the Everglades he had made with members of the Audubon club on which their boat ran out of gas, leaving them stranded for a day-and-a-half.

Writing
Theodore Pratt published more than thirty novels, including four mysteries under the pseudonym of "Timothy Brace", two collections of short stories, two plays (adapted from his novels), a few non-fiction books and pamphlets, and numerous short stories and articles in periodicals such as Esquire, Blue Book, Escapade, The Gent, Manhunt, Guilty Detective Story Magazine, Coronet, Fantastic Universe, Space Science Fiction, and The Saturday Evening Post.  Some of his novels had strong sexual content by the standards of the time.  The Tormented (1950), a study of nymphomania, was turned down by thirty-four publishers. It eventually sold more than a million copies.

Film adaptations
Five of his works were made into feature motion pictures: 
His 1941 novel Mercy Island was filmed the same year, also titled Mercy Island
His April 26, 1941, article "Land of the Jook" for The Saturday Evening Post was filmed as Juke Girl in 1942.
1942's Mr. Limpet was made into the Don Knotts film The Incredible Mr. Limpet in 1964
1943's Mr. Winkle Goes to War was filmed as Mr. Winkle Goes to War in 1944
1943's The Barefoot Mailman was released as The Barefoot Mailman in 1951

The Theodore Pratt Collection of first editions and manuscript material can be found in the Special Collections section of the library at Florida Atlantic University in Boca Raton.

References

 Note: No page numbers in article.
The Fiction Mags Index - Pratt, Theodore URL retrieved February 24, 2014 (Note: The URL shifts as the index grows.)

External links
 
 

Novelists from Florida
Writers from New Rochelle, New York
20th-century American novelists
American male novelists
1901 births
1969 deaths
People from Delray Beach, Florida
People from Boca Raton, Florida
People from Lake Worth Beach, Florida
Writers from Minneapolis
20th-century American male writers
Novelists from New York (state)
Novelists from Minnesota
New Rochelle High School alumni